Nchimunya Mweetwa (born March 22, 1984) is a Zambian football striker for Nico United.

Career
Mweetwa began his career whilst still at high school, with his Choma based school being a feeder club for local second division club Kabibya United.

After playing for Medical Stars, Ndola United, Kitwe United and Zesco United in Zambia, Mweetwa went on trial with Finnish Veikkausliiga club RoPS, eventually signing with them. During his first season with RoPS, Mweetwa scored 17 goals in 24 games, which included a run of scoring 1 goal in 12 consecutive games. Mweetwa's second season was cut short by a serious knee injury.

In the 2010 Ykkönen season Mweetwa made dramatic come-back with total of 13 goals in 23 games, of which in 13 he was in the starting line-up. He was the top scorer for RoPS and according to local newspaper Lapin Kansa, he received three offers from foreign clubs outside Finland.

In August 2014, Mweetwa was named as one of three foreign players for SC Villa's 2014–15 Uganda Super League season.

In September 2015, Mweetwa received a work permit to join Botswana Premier League club Nico United.

Match Fixing
On 24 March 2011, Mweetwa and seven other RoPS players, Godfrey Chibanga, Chileshe Chibwe, Francis Kombe, Stephen Kunda, Christopher Musonda, Chanda Mwaba, Pavle Khorguashvili and Valter Khorguashvili were all arrested and taken into custody on match-fixing charges. In July 2011, Mweetwa received a suspended jail sentence for his part in the match fixing scandal. On 30 April 2012, Chibanga, Chibwe, Kunda, Musonda, Mwaba, Nchimunya and Mweetwa were all banned from football by FIFA until 5 April 2013.

Career statistics

International

Statistics accurate as of match played 1 October 2005

References

External links
  at rops.fi
  at veikkausliiga.com

1984 births
Zambian footballers
Zambian expatriate footballers
Zambia international footballers
Expatriate footballers in Finland
Zambian expatriate sportspeople in Finland
Association football forwards
Veikkausliiga players
Rovaniemen Palloseura players
Living people
Ndola United F.C. players
ZESCO United F.C. players
Sportspeople from Lusaka